Ogorodnikov (masculine), or Ogorodnikova (feminine) is a Russian surname, which is derived from the Russian word "огородник" (truck farmer). Notable people with the surname include:

Aleksandr Ogorodnikov (born 1967), water polo player
Alexander Ogorodnikov, Russian activist and Gulag survivor
Andrei Ogorodnikov (born 1982), ice hockey player
Vladimir Ogorodnikov (born 1945), Soviet Russian philosopher
Nikolai Orgordnikov and Svetlana Ogorodnikova, convicted Soviet spies
Sergei Ogorodnikov, several people

Russian-language surnames